James Sterling Clark (October 7, 1921 – June 6, 2000) of Eufaula, Barbour County, Alabama, served as the mayor of the City of Eufaula from 1976 to 1978, and served four consecutive terms in the Senate of Alabama from 1959 to 1975. He served as the chair of the Senate Rules Committee for 12 of those 16 years. Clark was initially elected to the Alabama House of Representatives in 1983, representing Barbour and Russell Counties, during which he served as the chair of the House Rules Committee, and subsequently was reelected by the residents of his district for three additional terms, 1986 to 1990, 1990 to 1994, and 1994 to 1998.

Clark was entrusted by the members of the House with the Office of Speaker in 1987, 1991, and an unprecedented third term in 1995. Clark died in June 2000.

References

Sources
 Resolution of the Alabama House or Representativiews, 1999, HJR2, By Representative Newton (D), RFD, Rd 1 12-JAN-1999  

2000 deaths
People from Eufaula, Alabama
Mayors of places in Alabama
Members of the Alabama House of Representatives
Alabama state senators
1921 births
Speakers of the Alabama House of Representatives
20th-century American politicians